Villa Ekeliden is a historical building in Karlskoga, Karlskoga Municipality, Sweden, situated within the city center at Centralplan, bordered by an esker to the east. It is the second oldest building in the city proper, the oldest being the Karlskoga Church.

History 
It is a wooden light-yellow-colored building with horizontal paneling.

Villa Ekeliden has had multi-purpose use; a bell-ringer's house; a pharmacy as it appears in Selma Lagerlöf's 1925 novel Charlotte Löwensköld (from 1867); a public library, and it now houses a restaurant and coffeehouse.

In 2019, the building caught fire.

References

Citations

Works cited

External links 
 Official website

Buildings and structures in Karlskoga Municipality